Col de la Lombarde (or Colle della Lombarda) (el. 2350 m.) is a high mountain pass above the ski resort of Isola 2000 on the border between France and Italy.

Details of the climb

From Italy, the climb starts at Vinadio and is 21.5 km long. Over this distance, the climb is 1447 m. (an average percentage of 6.9%), with the steepest sections at 9.1% (although some bends reach over 14%).

From France, the climb starts at Isola and is 21.2 km long. Over this distance, the climb is 1477 m. (an average percentage of 7%), with the steepest sections at 9.3% at the foot of the climb.

Tour de France
The Tour de France crossed the pass for the first time in 2008, approaching from Italy via Vinadio on the 157 km sixteenth stage from Cuneo to Jausiers.

Appearances in Tour de France

Notes

See also
 List of highest paved roads in Europe
 List of mountain passes

External links 
Preview of Bonette Stage in 2008 Tour de France
Profile on climbbybike.com
Le col de la Lombarde dans le Tour de France 

Mountain passes of Provence-Alpes-Côte d'Azur
Mountain passes of the Alps
France–Italy border crossings